Lathrolestes is a genus of parasitoid wasps in the family Ichneumonidae and the tribe Perilissini.

Species 
The Catalogue of Life lists the following:

 Lathrolestes albicinctus
 Lathrolestes aquilus
 Lathrolestes asperatus
 Lathrolestes bipunctatus
 Lathrolestes breviremus
 Lathrolestes buccinator
 Lathrolestes bulbus
 Lathrolestes bullatus
 Lathrolestes carinatus
 Lathrolestes caudatus
 Lathrolestes citreus
 Lathrolestes citrofrontalis
 Lathrolestes clavipes
 Lathrolestes clypeatus
 Lathrolestes constrictus
 Lathrolestes convexus
 Lathrolestes dentatus
 Lathrolestes ensator
 Lathrolestes erugatus
 Lathrolestes euryremus
 Lathrolestes frontator
 Lathrolestes gibbosus
 Lathrolestes haroldi
 Lathrolestes irenea
 Lathrolestes jennyae
 Lathrolestes karenae
 Lathrolestes kulingensis
 Lathrolestes lucidulus
 Lathrolestes luteolator
 Lathrolestes luteolus
 Lathrolestes macropygus
 Lathrolestes meridionalis
 Lathrolestes messae
 Lathrolestes minimus
 Lathrolestes mnemonicae
 Lathrolestes morator
 Lathrolestes moravicus
 Lathrolestes nasoni
 Lathrolestes nigircollis
 Lathrolestes nigricollis
 Lathrolestes nigrifacies
 Lathrolestes obscurellus
 Lathrolestes occultor
 Lathrolestes ochraceus
 Lathrolestes orbitalis
 Lathrolestes periclistae
 Lathrolestes pictilis
 Lathrolestes pictus
 Lathrolestes planus
 Lathrolestes platynus
 Lathrolestes pleuralis
 Lathrolestes profenusae
 Lathrolestes protenus
 Lathrolestes protrusus
 Lathrolestes ruwenzoricus
 Lathrolestes saliceti
 Lathrolestes soleatus
 Lathrolestes striatus
 Lathrolestes tomostethi
 Lathrolestes truncatus
 Lathrolestes ungularis
 Lathrolestes verticalis
 Lathrolestes zeugophorae

Gallery

References

External links 
 
 

 Ichneumoninae
Ichneumonidae genera